Hookers for Jesus is an evangelical Christian organization focused on human rights of people who work in the sex industry and fights sex trafficking.

History

The organization was founded in 2005 by Annie Lobert, a former sex worker turned Christian in Las Vegas.  In 2007, she set up a safe house program ("Destiny House") at The Church at South Las Vegas, for victims of sex trafficking and sex workers. In 2008, she collaborated with Heather Veitch of JC's Girls at the AVN Adult Entertainment Expo in Las Vegas.

Controversies 
In 2020, the organization was criticized for receiving a grant from the United States Department of Justice, due to a handbook of its safe house rules published in 2018 mentioning that homosexuality was immoral and that attendance at the organization's weekly church services was mandatory. Lobert replied that the manual no longer contained statements about homosexuality and that attendance at religious services was no longer mandatory.

References

External links
 

Evangelical parachurch organizations